Ligusticum grayi is a species of flowering plant in the carrot family known by the common name Gray's licorice-root. It is native to the western United States from Montana to California, where it grows in moist, mountainous habitat, such as meadows and forest floors. It is a carrotlike, perennial herb growing from a taproot to heights between 20 and 80 centimeters. The leaves are like those of its relatives, including celery, each divided into several leaflets with pointed lobes. The inflorescence is a compound umbel of many small, white flowers. The Atsugewi used various parts of this plant for medicinal and other uses.

The species could be confused with poison hemlock.

References

External links
Jepson Manual Treatment: Ligusticum grayi
USDA Plants Profile
Ligusticum grayi — U.C. Photo gallery

grayi
Flora of California
Flora of Idaho
Flora of Montana
Flora of Nevada
Flora of Oregon
Flora of the Cascade Range
Flora of the Klamath Mountains
Flora of the Sierra Nevada (United States)
Flora of the Great Basin
Flora without expected TNC conservation status